Giorgio Scerbanenco (28 July 1911 – 27 October 1969) was an Italian crime writer.

Novels
Milano Quartet (Duca Lamberti series)
A Private Venus (Venere privata), Garzanti, 1966
Traitors to All (Traditori di tutti), Garzanti, 1966
I ragazzi del massacro, Garzanti, 1968
I milanesi ammazzano al sabato, Garzanti, 1969

Arthur Jelling series
Sei giorni di preavviso, Mondadori 1940
La bambola cieca, Mondadori 1941
Nessuno è colpevole, Mondadori 1941
L'antro dei filosofi, Mondadori, 1942
Il cane che parla, Mondadori 1942
Lo scandalo dell'osservatorio astronomico, inedito, 1943

Swiss exile works
Il mestiere di uomo, 1944
Annalisa e il passaggio a livello, Tecla e Rosellina, C. Scerbanenco, 1944
Il cavallo venduto, Rizzoli 1963
Lupa in convento, Garzanti 1999
Non rimanere soli, 1945
Luna di miele, Baldini & Castoldi, 1945
Patria mia, 1945

New Mexico cycle
Il grande incanto, Rizzoli, 1948
La mia ragazza di Magdalena, Rizzoli, 1949
Luna messicana, Rizzoli, 1949
Innamorati, Rizzoli, 1951

Other novels
Gli uomini in grigio, 1935
Il terzo amore, Rizzoli, 1938
Il paese senza cielo, 1939
L'amore torna sempre, Sacse, 1941
Oltre la felicità, Sacse, 1941
Quattro cuori nel buio, Sacse, 1941
È passata un'illusione, Sacse, 1941
Cinema fra le donne, 1942
Fine del mondo, 1942
Infedeli innamorati, 1942
Cinque in bicicletta, Mondadori, 1943
Il bosco dell'inquietudine, Ultra, 1943
Si vive bene in due, Mondadori, 1943
La notte è buia, Mondadori, 1943
L'isola degli idealisti, Perduto, 1942
Viaggio in Persia, Perduto, 1942
Annalisa e il passaggio a livello, 1944; Sellerio 2007
Ogni donna è ferita, Rizzoli, 1947
Quando ameremo un angelo, Rizzoli, 1948
La sposa del falco, Rizzoli, 1949
Anime senza cielo, Rizzoli, 1950
I giorni contati, Rizzoli, 1952
Il fiume verde, Rizzoli, 1952
Il nostro volo è breve, Rizzoli, 1951
Amata fino all'alba, Rizzoli, 1953
Appuntamento a Trieste, Rizzoli, 1953
Desidero soltanto, Rizzoli 1953
Uomini e colombe, Rizzoli, 1954
La mano nuda, Rizzoli, 1954
Johanna della foresta, Rizzoli, 1955
Mio adorato nessuno, Rizzoli, 1955
I diecimila angeli, Rizzoli, 1956
La ragazza dell'addio, Rizzoli, 1956
Via dei poveri amori, Rizzoli, 1956
Cristina che non visse, Rizzoli, 1957
Elsa e l'ultimo uomo, Rizzoli, 1958
Il tramonto è domani, Rizzoli, 1958
Noi due e nient'altro, Rizzoli, 1959
Viaggio di nozze in grigio, Rizzoli, 1961
Europa molto amore, Annabella, 1961; Garzanti, 1966
La sabbia non ricorda, Rizzoli, 1963
Al mare con la ragazza, Garzanti, 1965
L'anaconda, La Tribuna, 1967
Al servizio di chi mi vuole, Longanesi, 1970
Le principesse di Acapulco, Garzanti, 1970
Le spie non devono amare, Garzanti, 1971
Ladro contro assassino, Garzanti, 1971
Né sempre né mai, Sonzogno, 1974
Dove il sole non sorge mai, Garzanti, 1975
Romanzo rosa, Rizzoli, 1985

Short story collections
Voce di Adrian, Rizzoli, 1956
Milano calibro 9, Garzanti, 1969
Il centodelitti, Garzanti, 1970
I sette peccati capitali e le sette virtù capitali, Rizzoli, 1974
La notte della tigre, Rizzoli, 1975
I sette peccati capitali e le sette virtù capitali la notte della tigre, Rizzoli, 1977
L'ala ferita dell'angelo, Rizzoli, 1976
La vita in una pagina, Mondadori, 1989
Il falcone e altri racconti inediti, Frassinelli, 1993
Il Cinquecentodelitti, Frassinelli, 1994
Cinque casi per l'investigatore Jelling, Frassinelli, 1995
Millestorie, Frassinelli, 1996
Storie dal futuro e dal passato, Frassinelli, 1997
Basta col cianuro, Cartacanta, 2000
Uccidere per amore, Sellerio, 2002
Racconti neri, Garzanti, 2005
Uomini Ragno, Sellerio, 2006
Nebbia sul Naviglio e altri racconti gialli e neri, Sellerio, 2011
Patria mia. Riflessioni e confessioni sull'Italia, Aragno, 2011

References 
 
 
 

Bibliographies of Italian writers